Francisco Farabello (born 1 November 2000) is an Argentine college basketball player for the Creighton Bluejays of the Big East Conference. He previously played for the TCU Horned Frogs.

Early life and career
Farabello is the son of Argentine basketball player Daniel Farabello and moved around growing up to follow his father's career. The younger Farabello attended the NBA Global Academy in Australia, as he considered the facilities in Argentina to be inadequate. He participated in Basketball Without Borders Americas camp in 2017, as well as the Basketball Without Borders Global Camp at the NBA All-Star game in 2018. Farabello committed to TCU in October 2018, citing a strong connection with the players and the coaching staff. He chose the Horned Frogs over offers from Davidson and Cincinnati.

College career
On 22 February 2020, Farabello sustained a concussion in a game against West Virginia. He averaged 3.7 points, 1.4 rebounds and 2.2 assists per game as a freshman. Farabello dealt with injury and COVID-19 concerns during his sophomore season. He was ruled out for the season on 20 February 2021, after being sidelined for more than a month. Farabello averaged 5.3 points and 2.3 assists per game as a sophomore. He posted 4.4 points, 1.9 rebounds, and 1.8 assists per game as a junior. Following the season, Farabello transferred to Creighton.

National team career
Farabello has represented Argentina in several international competitions. He won the bronze medal at the 2018 FIBA Under-18 Americas Championship. Farabello averaged 8.3 points, 5.3 assists, and 4.3 rebounds per game during the tournament. He was selected to participate in the 2019 FIBA Under-19 Basketball World Cup. Farabello averaged 6.4 points, 4 assists, and 3.7 rebounds per game.

Career statistics

College

|-
| style="text-align:left;"| 2019–20
| style="text-align:left;"| TCU
| 30 || 7 || 20.6 || .409 || .410 || .846 || 1.4 || 2.2 || 0.8 || 0.1 || 3.7
|-
| style="text-align:left;"| 2020–21
| style="text-align:left;"| TCU
| 9 || 5 || 24.4 || .436 || .448 || .200 || 1.7 || 2.3 || 1.1 || 0.0 || 5.3
|-
| style="text-align:left;"| 2021–22
| style="text-align:left;"| TCU
| 34 || 6 || 19.0 || .385 || .384 || .900 || 2.4 || 1.3 || 0.6 || 0.0 || 4.7
|- class="sortbottom"
| style="text-align:center;" colspan="2"| Career
| 73 || 18 || 20.3 || .402 || .402 || .813 || 1.9 || 1.8 || 0.7 || 0.1 || 4.4

References

External links
TCU Horned Frogs bio
Creighton Bluejays bio

2000 births
Living people
Argentine expatriate basketball people in the United States
Argentine men's basketball players
Shooting guards
Sportspeople from Buenos Aires Province
TCU Horned Frogs men's basketball players